Moisés Moleiro (28 March 190418 June 1979) was a Venezuelan pianist and composer. He was born in 1904 and studied under Salvador Llamozas. Moleiro founded the Orfeón Lamas and taught piano at the Caracas Musical Declamation Academy (today the Escuela de Música José Ángel Lamas). His works have been performed in the United States, Europe, and across Latin America.  One of his most popular compositions is the Joropo, a piano take on Venezuela's folkloric music. He died in 1979.

Moleiro had 3 children, Moises Moleiro was a historian and politician, while his other 2 children, Federico was a poet and Carmencita became a pianist.

Selected works 

Danza Salvaje 
Endecha 
Estampas del Llano 
La Fuente 
Sonatina en La menor 
Tocata en Do # menor 
Tocata en Do mayor
Joropo
Canción De Cuna 
Rondó, de la Sonata al estilo clásico

References 
Venezuela Symphony orchestra Magazine, 25th anniversary, 1955.
Information from the album Aguas de Tebanarempa (2001).

External links

1904 births
1979 deaths
People from Guárico
Venezuelan classical musicians
Venezuelan pianists
20th-century classical pianists